The 1946 Texas gubernatorial election was held on November 5, 1946.

Incumbent Democratic Governor Coke R. Stevenson did not seek re-election.

Democratic Governor nominee Beauford H. Jester defeated Republican nominee Eugene Nolte, Jr. with 91.23% of the vote.

Nominations

Democratic primary
The Democratic primary election was held on July 27, 1946, with the runoff held on August 24, 1946.

Candidates
Floyd Brinkley
William V. Brown, mayor of Texarkana
A. J. Burks, mayor of Odessa
Charles B. Hutchison
Beauford H. Jester, Railroad Commissioner
Caso March, former Baylor University law professor, World War II veteran
Walter Scott McNutt, president of Jefferson College and independent candidate for Governor of Arkansas in 1938 and 1940
Homer P. Rainey, former President of the University of Texas
Jerry Sadler, former Railroad Commissioner
Grover Sellers, incumbent Texas Attorney General
C. R. Shaw
John Lee Smith, incumbent Lieutenant Governor
Reese Turner, former State Representative

Withdrew

W. J. Minton, newspaper editor and unsuccessful candidate for Democratic nomination for Governor in 1944

Declined
James V. Allred, former Governor
W. Lee O'Daniel, incumbent U.S. Senator
Coke R. Stevenson, incumbent Governor

Results

Republican nomination

The Republican state convention was held on August 13, 1946 at Mineral Wells.

Candidates

Alvin H. Lane, attorney
Eugene "Mike" Nolte, Jr., alcohol distributor

Results

General election

Candidates
Beauford H. Jester, Democratic
Eugene Nolte, Jr., Republican

Results

References

Bibliography
 
 

1946
Texas
Gubernatorial
November 1946 events in the United States